Pleasant Grove, originally named Battle Creek, is a city in Utah County, Utah, United States, known as "Utah's City of Trees". It is part of the Provo–Orem Metropolitan Statistical Area. The population was 37,726 at the 2020 Census.

History

Settlement and incorporation
On July 19, 1850, William H. Adams, John Mercer and Philo T. Farnsworth, Mormon pioneers sent by Brigham Young, arrived at the area now known as Pleasant Grove and staked out farms in what is now the southwest corner of the city. A small community was established September 13, 1850, consisting of George S. Clark and his wife, Susannah Dalley Clark, Richard and Ann Elizabeth Sheffer Clark, John Greenleaf Holman and Nancy Clark Holman, Lewis Harvey and his wife Lucinda Clark Harvey, Johnathan Harvey and Sarah Herbert Harvey, Charles Price and wife and child, Widow Harriet Marler and children, John Wilson, Ezekiel Holman, and possibly one or two others, relatives of those mentioned. Of note, William Fletcher and Anne Hawley Reynolds in 1852 brought Ellis Reynolds Shipp to live, which Shipp became the legendary MD, Obstetrician, and Pediatrician, through the young women's midwife training program of Dr. Richards and Eliza Snow, beginning her training in young women's MIA in Pleasant Grove.  Pleasant Grove was officially incorporated as a town January 18, 1855, by which time the settlement had grown to 623 people.

Early relations with Native Americans
The original name of the city was Battle Creek. It was named for a massacre which took place there in 1849 between Mormon settlers and a small band of Ute Indians, wherein all the male Utes were massacred when Brigham Young believed the natives had stolen some of his horses (which were found before the attack on the Utes occurred). The settlers later decided they needed a more uplifting name and began calling their town Pleasant Grove after a grove of cottonwood trees located between Battle Creek and Grove Creek, near the current-day intersection of Locust Avenue and Battle Creek Drive. A monument with a plaque describing this battle is located at Kiwanis Park, at the mouth of Battle Creek Canyon.

During the Walker Indian War in the 1850s, citizens built a fort with walls two or three feet thick and six feet tall that occupied an area the size of sixteen city blocks. The settlers in the area at the time built homes inside the fort. While the fort no longer stands, memorial cornerstones were erected by local historians.  The northeast monument was erected near the intersection of 100 North and 300 East streets. The northwest monument was erected four blocks west of that point at 100 West Street and the southeast monument erected four blocks south at 300 South Street. The southwest monument would have been located near 300 South 100 West, the area is now occupied by a large parking lot and retail store.

Recent events
This city was one of the filming locations for Universal's 1995 film Gold Diggers: The Secret of Bear Mountain. 
Also some filming of Stephen King's "The Stand".

Geography

Sloping off the Mt. Timpanogos bench, Pleasant Grove is represented by a large, white hillside letter "G" just above the city.

Climate
Pleasant Grove's climate features cold winters and hot, dry summers. Under the Köppen climate classification, Pleasant Grove has a hot-summer Mediterranean climate (Csa).

Demographics

As of the census of 2010, there were 33,509 people, 6,109 households, and 5,388 families residing in the city. The population density was 2,691.5 per square mile (1,039.1/km2). There were 6,334 housing units at an average density of 726.4 per square mile (280.5/km2). The racial makeup of the city was 95.15% White, 0.29% African American, 0.38% Native American, 0.54% Asian, 0.39% Pacific Islander, 1.75% from other races, and 1.50% from two or more races. Hispanic or Latino of any race were 4.56% of the population.

There were 6,109 households, out of which 58.0% had children under the age of 18 living with them, 77.0% were married couples living together, 8.6% had a female householder with no husband present, and 11.8% were non-families. 9.2% of all households were made up of individuals, and 3.6% had someone living alone who was 65 years of age or older. The average household size was 3.83 and the average family size was 4.11.

In the city, the population was spread out, with 41.0% under the age of 18, 11.3% from 18 to 24, 28.0% from 25 to 44, 13.8% from 45 to 64, and 5.9% who were 65 years of age or older. The median age was 24 years. For every 100 females, there were 100.8 males. For every 100 females age 18 and over, there were 98.2 males.

The median income for a household in the city was $52,036, and the median income for a family was $54,182. Males had a median income of $42,042 versus $23,296 for females. The per capita income for the city was $15,268. About 5.4% of families and 6.8% of the population were below the poverty line, including 8.1% of those under age 18 and 3.1% of those age 65 or over.

Government
The city's government consists of a mayor and a city council. As of January 2018, the city's mayor is Guy L. Fugal. The city council is made up of five members: Dianna Anderson, Eric Jensen, Todd N. Williams, Cyd LeMone and Brent Bullock.  Council members serve staggered terms that end in either 2020 or 2022.

Strawberry Days
Pleasant Grove is home to the summer festival known as Strawberry Days. The first annual “Strawberry Day” (initially a single-day event) was held on June 21, 1922, with 10,000-15,000 people in attendance. The festival was organized by the Wasatch Club, a forerunner of today’s Chamber of Commerce. This first celebration included strawberries and cream and a parade; both remain staples of modern-day Strawberry Days.

The festival’s name originated when strawberry farming was a major economic activity in the city. (Approximately 250 acres of strawberries were being grown in the area when the first festival was held in 1922). The festival retains the traditional name, even though large-scale commercial growing of the fruit no longer occurs in the city. The festival is Utah’s second oldest community harvest festival, younger only than Brigham City's Peach Days–a festival Strawberry Days’ founders hoped to rival.

Today, a rodeo held in conjunction with this festival brings competitors and spectators from throughout the West. The festival includes parades, a carnival, pageants and other activities. The festival is usually held the third week of June, a period chosen in 1922, which would generally correspond with the end of the strawberry harvest for the area.

First amendment case

In November 2008, the United States Supreme Court heard oral arguments in the case of Pleasant Grove City v. Summum. The case regarded whether Pleasant Grove, which allowed the display of a privately-donated Ten Commandments on public property, must also allow the religion of Summum to display a monument to its "Seven Aphorisms" alongside. Pleasant Grove had declined the Summum offer in 2003.  The city lost in the Tenth Circuit. However, the city appealed to the Supreme Court which overturned the Court of Appeals decision, citing the permanence of monuments as opposed to forms of constitutionally-protected free speech as well as the fact that governments take ownership of monuments on their properties and thus must "take some care in accepting donated monuments."

Education

Public schools in Pleasant Grove are part of the Alpine School District. Charter schools include John Hancock Charter School and Lincoln Academy. Liahona Preparatory Academy is an accredited K-12 private school serving the area.

Local schools

Elementary schools
 Central
 Grovecrest
 John Hancock Charter School
 Liahona Preparatory Academy
 Lincoln Academy
 Manila
 Mount Mahogany
 Valley View

Junior high/middle schools
Lincoln Academy
Pleasant Grove Junior High School

High schools
Pleasant Grove High School

Recreation
Community Center
Veterans Memorial Pool

Attractions
Evermore Park
Christa McAuliffe Space Education Center
Taco Amigo
Mount Timpanogos Utah Temple (on the border in neighboring American Fork)
Pleasant Grove Pioneers Parade
Purple Turtle
Water Gardens Cinemas
Chubby's Cafe

Notable people 
 Quinn Allman, musician, The Used
 Howard Roscoe Driggs, Western historian and educator; born in Pleasant Grove; brother of William King Driggs, Sr.
 Todd Herzog, winner of reality TV show Survivor: China
 Chelsie Hightower, contestant on So You Think You Can Dance
 Dane Iorg, former Major League Baseball player (St. Louis Cardinals, Kansas City Royals); World Series champion
 The King Sisters, and their father, agent and organizer William King Driggs, Sr.
 A. Ray Olpin, President of University of Utah from 1946 to 1964
 C. J. Wilcox, 28th overall pick in the 2014 NBA draft; shooting guard for the Orlando Magic

Gallery

References

External links

 City of Pleasant Grove official website

 
Cities in Utah
Populated places established in 1850
Provo–Orem metropolitan area
Cities in Utah County, Utah